Jid Al-Haj (Jid Al-Hahj) is one of the smallest villages of Bahrain.

Name
The Bahraini historian and researcher Mohammed bin Ali Al-Tajer says in his book Aqd Al Lalali Fi Tarikh Awal that the word "Jid" means coast, so the word Jid Al-Haj means the Coast of the Hahj, i.e., a person who has performed the Hajj pilgrimage.

Populated places in the Northern Governorate, Bahrain